Royal Tunbridge Wells is a town in Kent, England. The following is a list of those people who were either born or live(d) in Royal Tunbridge Wells, or made some important contribution to the town. As a spa town Royal Tunbridge Wells was a popular resort for the upper classes, including members of the British royal family.

Notable people from Royal Tunbridge Wells


A
 Peter Adolph (1916-1994), Inventor of Subbuteo Table Soccer
 Joe Alwyn (1991– ), actor
 Jonathan Anders (1971– ), Shropshire cricketer

B
 Luke Baldwin (1990– ), rugby player
 Gary Barden (1955– ), musician
 The Reverend Thomas Bayes (1702–1761), mathematician, who lived in Ashton Lodge
 Will Bayley (1988– ), paralympian
 C. A. Bayly (1945–2015), historian
 Jeff Beck (1944– ), musician
 Rachel Beer (1858–1927), newspaper editor
 Compton Bennett (1900–1974), film director
 Golding Bird (1814–1854), medical writer
 Frank W. Boreham (1871–1959), Baptist preacher
 Jo Brand (1957– ), comedian
 William Thomas Brande (1788–1866), chemist
 Gary Brazil (1962– ), football player
 Nick Brown (1950– ), politician
 Edward Bulwer-Lytton, 1st Baron Lytton (1803–1873), author
 Thomas Harrison Burder (1789–1843), physician and author
 Peter Burton (1924–2007), physicist, philosopher, logician
 Ballard Berkeley, British actor

C
 John Douglas Sutherland Campbell, 9th Duke of Argyll (1845–1914), Governor General of Canada
 Oliver Chris (1978– ), actor
 George Cohen (1939– ), football player
 Paul Condon, Baron Condon (1947– ), police commissioner
 Emma Corrin (1995-), actress
 Martin Corry (1973– ), rugby player
 The Reverend Arthur Shearly Cripps (1869–1952), missionary and writer
 Sidney Elisabeth Croskery (1901–1990), doctor
 Richard Cumberland (1732–1811), dramatist
 Sir Alan Gordon Cunningham (1887–1963), military officer

D
 Gerald Charles Dickens (1963–), actor and performer 
 Marcus Dillistone (1961–), film director
 Sir Howard Douglas, Bt. (1776–1861), military officer
 Keith Douglas (1920–1944), poet
 Roy Douglas (1907–2015), classical composer
 Hugh Dowding, 1st Baron Dowding (1882–1970), Royal Air Force officer
Dominic Sherwood (1990-), actor and model

E
 John Cox Dillman Engleheart (1784–1862), miniature painter

F
 Arthur Fagg (1915–1977), cricketer
 Caroline Fry (1787–1846), writer

G
 Thomas Field Gibson (1803–1889), Tunbridge Wells improvement commissioner and Royal Commissioner for the Great Exhibition of 1851
 Jeremy Gilbert-Rolfe, artist and educator
 Jilly Goolden (1956– ), television personality
 Léon Goossens (1897–1988), oboist
 The Reverend Edward Meyrick Goulburn (1818–1897), clergyman and writer ↑
 David Gower (1957– ), cricketer
 Pauline Gower (1910-1947) pilot, commandant of the Women's Air Transport Auxiliary in Second World War 
 Sir Robert Gower, MP (1880–1953)
 Sarah Grand (1854–1943), suffragist and "New Woman" writer
 Sir Tyrone Guthrie (1900–1971), theatrical director

H
 Ker Baillie Hamilton (1804–1889), colonial governor
 Henry Hardinge, 1st Viscount Hardinge (1785–1856), Viceroy of India
 Jake Hill (1994–), racing driver in the British Touring Car Championship
 Philip Carteret Hill (1821–1894), Nova Scotia politician 
 Katrina Hodge, soldier and Miss England 2009

J
 Louise Jameson (1951– ), actress
 Richard Jones (1790–1855), economist

L
 Danny La Rue (1927–2009), entertainer
 Enid Lakeman (1903–1995), political reformer 
 Duncan Lamont (1918–1978), actor
 Sydney Turing Barlow Lawford (1865–1953), Lieutenant-General and father of actor Peter Lawford 
 Ron Ledger (1920–2004), politician
 Henry Bilson Legge (1708–1764), politician
 Princess Louise, Duchess of Argyll (1848–1939), daughter of Queen Victoria

M
 Annunzio Paolo Mantovani (1905–1980), 
 Patrick Mayhew, Baron Mayhew (1929–2016), politician
 Alec McCowen (1925–2017), actor
 Victor McLaglen (1886–1959), actor

N
 Richard (Beau) Nash (1674–1762), celebrated dandy and leader of fashion
 William Nicholson (1948– ), writer

O
 Sir Charles Ogle, Bt. (1775–1858), naval officer

P
 Tim Page (1944–2022), photojournalist
 Charles Paulet, 3rd Duke of Bolton (1685–1754), politician
 Tim Pears (1956– ), novelist
 Eliza Phillips (1822/3–1916), conservationist and co-founder of the Royal Society for the Protection of Birds
 Rose Pipette (1986– ), pop singer with The Pipettes

R
 Sir Richard Robinson (1849–1928), businessman and local politician
 Richard Rose (1982– ), footballer

S
 Sir David Lionel Salomons (1851–1925), scientist
 Sarah Sands (1961– ), journalist
 Henry Albert Seymour (1861–1938), secularist, anarchist and gramophone pioneer
 Mary Monica Maxwell-Scott (1852–1920), author 
 Dominic Sherwood (1990– ), actor
 Slaves, musical band
 Colin Smart (1950– ), rugby player
 Horace Smith (1779–1849), poet and novelist
 Jamie Spence (1963– ), golfer
 Sir Thomas Abel Brimage Spratt (1811–1888), naval officer
 The Reverend Thomas Roscoe Rede Stebbing (1835–1926), zoologist
 Gary A. Stevens (1962– ), footballer
 Francis Meadow Sutcliffe (1863–1941), photographer

T
 William Temple (1833–1919), recipient of the Victoria Cross
 William Makepeace Thackeray (1811–1863), novelist
 Bob Todd (1921–1992), comedy actor

V
Krystal Versace (2001–Present), Winner of RuPaul's Drag Race UK (Season 3)
 Sid Vicious (1957–1979), musician

W
 Virginia Wade (1945– ), tennis player
 H T Waghorn (1842–1930), cricket historian
 Scott Wagstaff (1990– ), footballer
 Charity Wakefield (1981– ), actress
 Arthur Waley (1889–1966), Orientalist
 Nick Wallace (1972– ), writer
 Frank Weare (1896–1971), World War I flying ace
 William Webber (1800–1875), surgeon
 James Whitbourn (1963– ), composer

Z
 Andy Zaltzman, comedian and writer
 Helen Zaltzman, co-host of popular podcast, Answer me this

References 

 
Tunbridge Wells